Stuart Dunne is an Irish actor and artist. He is best known for his dark and violent portrayal of the character Billy Meehan on the Irish soap opera Fair City. He was nominated at the 2003 Irish Film and Television Awards for Best Actor in a Television Drama for Fair City.

Career
Dunne was born in 1957 in Dublin, Ireland. He comes from a large family, nine sisters and two brothers, from Drimnagh. He studied for five years in the Focus Theater under the direction of Deirdre O'Connell. Dunne married in 1988 years to his wife Geraldine, who is also his agent, and in 1991 their son Neil was born.

Dunne is a self-taught artist who has had his work shown on The Late Late Show on RTÉ One. He has also exhibited in the IFSC, the Davis Gallery, the James Gallery, and in England and the USA. Dunne's work hangs in The Roily Gallery, the oldest gallery in Dublin.

Dunne is currently working on the project; "Vincent: Questioning the Method", a character study where he will take on the role of Vincent Van Gogh through method acting. Set in Ireland, the film will reinterpret the last seventy days of Van Gogh's life in a modern-day retelling of this harrowing tale. The study will be documented by a film crew 24/7 for the duration, and will yield both web content and eventually a documentary feature. For more information go www.themethod.ie.

Filmography
 Doctors .... Joe McNair (1 episode, 2003)- Getting the Ride (2003) TV episode .... Joe McNair
 Murphy's Law .... Morrison (1 episode, 2003)- Manic Munday (2003) TV episode .... Morrison
 In Deep .... Tom (2 episodes, 2003)- Queen and Country: Part 2 (2003) TV episode .... Tom- Queen and Country: Part 1 (2003) TV episode .... Tom
 Fair City .... Billy Meehan (1 episode, 2001)- Billy and Leo (2001) TV episode .... Billy Meehan
 Family Affairs (1997) TV series .... Patrick McNeil (unknown episodes, 2000)
 Knocking on Death's Door (1999) .... Judd... aka Haunted House (Philippines: English title)
 Vicious Circle (1999) (TV) .... Niall
 Crush Proof (1998) .... The Da... aka Dublin Desperados (Germany)
 Mia, Liebe meines Lebens (1998) TV mini-series... aka Mia per sempre (Italy)
 Ballykissangel .... Soldier 1 (1 episode, 1998)- Pack up Your Troubles (1998) TV episode (uncredited) .... Soldier 1
 Stray Bullet (1998) .... Chester
 The MatchMaker (1997) .... Head Bang Man
 Bolt (1997) (as Stewart Dunne) .... Repairman
 The Van (1996) .... Sam
 A Man of No Importance (1994) .... John
 Ailsa (1994) .... Workman
 The Snapper (1993) (TV) .... Bertie
 "Lovejoy" .... Van Driver (1 episode, 1993)- Irish Stew (1993) TV episode (as Stewart Dunne) .... Van Driver
 The Flower and the Rabbit (1991)
 Joyriders (1989) .... Hank, the Barman
 Act of Betrayal (1988) (TV) .... Robert
 The Courier (1988) .... Tony

Appearances as himself
 Fair City: The Ten Commandments (2004) (TV) .... Himself
 The Late Late Show .... Himself (1 episode, 2004)- Episode dated 26 March 2004 (2004) TV episode .... Himself

See also
 Moscow Art Theatre
 Constantin Stanislavski
 Irish Film and Television Awards/2003-1
 Method Acting

References

 RTÉ Guide: 3–9 November 2001
 RTÉ Guide: 17–23 November 2001
 RTÉ Guide: 28 September – 4 Oct 2002
 IFTA 2003

External links

 Stuart Dunne on RTE
 Stuart Dunne on Film.com

1957 births
Living people
Irish artists
Irish male soap opera actors
Irish male television actors